Bounce is a 2000 American romantic drama film starring Ben Affleck and Gwyneth Paltrow and directed by Don Roos.

Plot
In Chicago's O'Hare airport, advertising executive Buddy Amaral is delayed by a snow storm for a return flight to Los Angeles, on the same airline he has just signed as a big client. He meets writer Greg Janello, and when his flight resumes boarding, Buddy gives his ticket to Greg so he can get home to his wife and sons, eight-year-old Scott and four-year-old Joey.

Buddy convinces his friend and airline employee Janice Guerrero to allow Greg to take his place on the flight. While spending the night with fellow stranded passenger Mimi, he sees on television that the flight crashed. He has Janice check into the computer system to change his for Greg's name on the passenger manifest.

Greg's wife Abby is woken up by news of the crash, and for many hours is torn between hope and despair, clinging to the belief that Greg would still arrive on the later flight on which he was originally booked, until his death is confirmed.

Once back in Los Angeles, the airline dictates that Buddy run a series of innocuous ads to ameliorate the tragic consequences of the crash, which win a Clio Award. Plagued with guilt, Buddy makes a drunken scene at the awards show, and begins a stint in Alcoholics Anonymous. One of the steps in recovery is to make up for past misdeeds, so Buddy seeks out Abby, a budding realtor, giving her a tip on a commercial office building that Jim, Buddy's partner and boss, has put a bid on. In return, Abby treats Buddy to a night at Dodger Stadium. Their relationship blossoms, even as Buddy does not tell her about being indirectly responsible for Greg's death.

When the airline settles with Greg's estate, Abby next wants to put her boys on an aircraft to Palm Springs to get over their fear of flying. Buddy asks to go along with them, and soon develops a strong bond with the two boys. On the return trip, Buddy says he has a secret he will reveal the next day.

It all comes apart when Mimi shows up, with a video of Greg and Buddy having a drink in the airport bar. Abby is devastated by Buddy lying to her and demands that he leave her home and her life - though also demands that he say goodbye to the boys. Buddy comes back the next day and talks to Scott, who is afraid that his father died trying to get home for a Boy Scouts Christmas tree outing. Abby harbors the same guilt for pressuring Greg to come home on the fateful flight.

The victims' families sue the airline for damages, and Janice's role is revealed when Buddy is called to testify. As Abby watches on television, Buddy explains that he gave his ticket to Greg and did not take Greg's in exchange. In coercing Janice to change the roster, the airline's security procedures were compromised, which gets her fired. Buddy is excused by the judge, but still feels guilty.

Buddy resigns from his firm, having compromised his client, the airline. Abby comes by to tell him that his talk with Scott had helped them both. Buddy, sensing that Abby is about to leave, asks her to help him rent his beachfront home or put it up for sale. As Buddy starts to talk about his plans, Abby realizes she can forgive him.

Cast
 Ben Affleck as Buddy Amaral
 Gwyneth Paltrow as Abby Janello
 Natasha Henstridge as Mimi Prager
 Edward Edwards as Ron Wachter
 Jennifer Grey as Janice Guerrero
 Tony Goldwyn as Greg Janello
 Lisa Joyner as T.V. Announcer
 Caroline Aaron as Donna
 Alex D. Linz as Scott Janello
 David Dorfman as Joey Janello
 Juan Garcia as Kevin Walters
 Joe Morton as Jim Willer
 Johnny Galecki as Seth
 David St. James as Judge
 David Paymer as Prosecuting Attorney Mandel (uncredited)

Production
Bounce  was a project previously in development with PolyGram Filmed Entertainment. Principal photography began on August 30, 1999, with shooting completed on November 7, 1999.

The film marks the first major motion picture to be delivered via satellite, with AMC Empire playing Bounce exclusively in its digital format/digital production. The film was later released in United States on video on April 10, 2001.

Music

Soundtrack

Score

 Weather [3:27]
 Bed Time [1:08]
 Boarding Pass [2:33]
 Moving Day [1:06]
 Hangover [0:57]
 Crash [1:37]
 Nice To Meet You [1:35]
 Now I Am [1:09]
 So Brave [1:45]
 Seven Steps [2:18]
 Christmas Trees [1:47]
 Award [1:21]
 Kiss [1:40]
 Deception [1:12]
 Say Goodbye [1:21]
 Testimony [1:36]
 You're Excused [1:46]
 Can We Try? [2:05]

Reception
Bounce received generally mixed reviews from film critics. As of January 2012, review aggregator Rotten Tomatoes has given it a 52% rating, with an average rating of 5.5 out of 10, based on 106 reviews. The site's consensus states: "Critics say Bounce is more of a thud. Plot turns feel cliched and contrived, and the romance between Paltrow and Affleck fails to engage." The film opened at #4 at the North American box office making $11.4 million its opening weekend.

Roger Ebert noted that the plot was a familiar one. "Lovers with untold secrets are a familiar movie situation ..." yet, he liked the film because the characters, from lead actors to secondary roles, were honest and endearing.

References

Notes

Citations

Bibliography

 Milano, Valerie. Gwyneth Paltrow. Toronto, Ontario, Canada: ECW Press, 2000. .

External links
 
 
 
 
 Movie stills

2000 films
2000 romantic drama films
American romantic drama films
American aviation films
Films about atonement
2000s English-language films
Films set in Los Angeles
Films shot in California
Films directed by Don Roos
Films with screenplays by Don Roos
Films produced by Steve Golin
Films scored by Mychael Danna
Miramax films
Films about grieving
Films about alcoholism
2000s American films